The 1974–75 Midland Football League season was the 75th in the history of the Midland Football League, a football competition in England.

At the end of the season the league introduced second division called Division One, while top division became Premier Division.

Clubs
The league featured 15 clubs which competed in the previous season, along with three new clubs:
Heanor Town, transferred from the West Midlands (Regional) League
Louth United, joined from the Lincolnshire League
Mexborough Town Athletic, joined from the Yorkshire League, for this season only competed in both league, later resigned from the Yorkshire League

League table

References

External links

Midland Football League (1889)
M